Harry Oliver White (6 January 1895 – 4 September 1987) was a Progressive Conservative party member of the House of Commons of Canada. He was born in Glanworth, Ontario and became a farmer by career. White served in World War I with the 63rd Field Battery, Canadian Expeditionary Force.

He won five consecutive elections at the Middlesex East riding from the 1945 federal election through the 1958 election. After completing his fifth term, the 24th Canadian Parliament, White left federal politics and did not seek another term in office.

He died in 1987 and is interred in Westminster, Ontario.

References

External links
 

1895 births
Canadian farmers
Canadian military personnel of World War I
Members of the House of Commons of Canada from Ontario
Progressive Conservative Party of Canada MPs
1987 deaths